The Supreme Court of Judicature at Fort William in Calcutta, was founded in 1774 by the Regulating Act of 1773. It replaced the Mayor's Court of Calcutta and was British India's highest court from 1774 until 1862, when the High Court of Calcutta was established by the Indian High Courts Act 1861.

From 1774 to the arrival of Parliament's Bengal Judicature Act of 1781 in June 1782, the Court claimed jurisdiction over any person residing in Bengal, Bihar or Orissa. These first years were known for their conflict with the Supreme Council of Bengal over the Court's jurisdiction. The conflict came to an end with Parliament's passing of the Bengal Judicature Act of 1781 which restricted the Supreme Court's jurisdiction to either those who lived in Calcutta, or to any British Subject in Bengal, Bihar and Orissa, thereby removing the Court's jurisdiction over any person residing in Bengal, Bihar and Orissa.

The courthouse itself was a two storied building with Ionic columns and an urn-topped balustrade and stood by the side of the Writers’ Buildings. The building also served as the Town Hall of Calcutta at one time. It was demolished in 1792 and replaced by the present building in 1832.

The Court's first judges were

 Sir Elijah Impey, Chief justice from 1774 to 1783 on his recall to England for impeachment.
 Stephen Caesar Le Maistre, Puisne judge from 1774 to 1777 on his death.
 John Hyde (judge), Puisne judge from 1774 to 1796 on his death.
 Robert Chambers, Puisne judge from 1774 to 1783, Acting Chief Justice from 1783 to 1791. Chief Justice from 1791-1798, on his resignation.
 Sir William Jones, Puisne judge from 1783 to 1794 on his death.
 Sir William Dunkin, Puisne judge from August 14, 1791 to unknown.

Chief Justices

 for Chief Justices after 1862 see High Court of Calcutta

Puisne Justices

References

Bengal
High Courts of India
1774 establishments in the British Empire
1862 disestablishments in Asia
18th century in Kolkata